Malladi Venkata Krishna Murthy (born 13 November 1949 in Vijayawada) is a Telugu writer known for writing thriller plots.

Writings 
Murthy wrote many novels and short stories. The film Jyothi Lakshmi (2015) is based on one of his novels, Mrs. Parankusam.

Phani Ramachandra made three Kannada movies based on his novels: Ganeshana Maduve, Gauri Ganesha, and Nanendu Nimmavane. His movie Ganesha I Love You had core plot elements adapted from the novel Rendu Rella Aaru.

Novels 

 Adigo Puli (thriller)
 Anaganaga Oka Atidhi
 Andamina Jeevitam
 Bluff Master
 The Guest
 Yamaya Namaha
 Adyatmika Chinna Kathalu
 Chantabbai (comedy novel): Made into Telugu movie Chantabbai
 Colonel Ekalingam Adventures Parts 1, 2 & 3 (comedy)
 D For Death (thriller)
 Death certificate (thriller)
 Dongaata (thriller)
 Dabbevariki Chedu (thriller) – made into Telugu movie of same name
 Daivam Vaipu (spiritual articles)
 Dharma Yudham (thriller)
 Enthentha Dooram (comedy novel)
 F.I.R (thriller)
 Jayam (spiritual novel)
 Kanabaduta ledu (thriller)
 A AA E EE (spiritual essays)
 Lupica Raani & Athadu Aame
 Mandakini
 Matlade Bomma (thriller)
 Misses Parankusam – made into Telugu movie Jyothi Lakshmi
 Parm jyothi (spiritual novel)
 Rendu Rella Aaru – made into Telugu movie Rendu Rella Aaru and the core plot element adapted in the Kannada movie Ganesha I Love You
 Saavirahe
 Mr V  (Thriller) – made into Telugu movie -Jhansi Rani 
 Mr No (thriller)
 Samudrapu Dongalu (thriller)
 Mudduku Mude Mullanta
 Mungita Mrutyuvu (thriller)
 Nattalostunnayi Jagratta (fantasy)
 Ninnati Punnami (family novel)
 Nivaali (thriller)
 Oka Nuvvu-Oka Nenu
 O Manchi Maata (spiritual articles)
 Paripoina Kaidheelu (thriller)
 Padamata Sandya Raagam
 Bali Korina Vajralu (thriller)
 Practical Joker (thriller)
 Punnami (thriller)
 Rakshasa Samharam (thriller)
 Shh gup chup (thriller) – made into a Telugu movie of same name
 Saddam Aunti Inti Katha (thriller)
 Bhaja Govindam – a treatise on Bhaja Govindam bt Adi Sankaracharya
 Sanivaram Naadi (thriller)
 Sorry! Wrong Number (thriller)
 Teneteega – made into Telugu movie Teneteega
 Tadanki the third (thriller)
 Touch Me not
 O My God (spiritual articles)
 Uncle Sam (thriller)
 Vaikunta Yatra (thriller)
 The End (thriller)
 Green Ccard (thriller)
 Sadguru Nitya Nanda Baba
 Peddalaku Maatrame (comedy) – made into a Telugu movie Srivari Shobanam (1985)
 Lavanya
 Airhostess (thriller)
 Repo Maapo Pellanta – made into Telugu movie Vichitram (1999)
 Kotta Satruvu (fantasy)
 Uncle Sam (thriller)
 Ee Ganta Gadisthe Chalu (thriller)
 Vinayaka Rao Pelli (Comedy) – made into Kannada movie Ganeshana Maduve
 Yamadoota (thriller)
 Chivari Korika) (thriller)
 Villain (thriller)
 Vidhata (spiritual novel)
 Repati Koduku – made into Telugu movie of same name and an inspiration for: Kannada movie Nanendu Nimmavane; Malayalam movie Minnaram; Hindi movie Hungama 2; Tamil movie  Penne Nee Vaazhga; and Tamil movie Azhagana Naatkal.
 Dooram (romance) – narrated through letters only
 Mr Miriyam (novel) – told through jokes only
  Neeku Naku Pellanta – made into Telugu movie of same name (1988)
 Ide, Na Nyayam! – made in Tamil and dubbed in Telugu as Dharma Yuddham
 Vitamin M (comedy) – made into Telugu movie Chakrapani and Lucky Chance
 Wedding Bells (comedy) – made into Kannada movie Gauri Ganesha, remade in Telugu as Golmaal Govindam and in Tamil as Kumbakonam Gopalu

Jokes books 

 Navvula Ravvalu
 Drinking jokes
 Chirunavvuku chirunaama
 Jokulaasthami
 Neade navvandi
 Smile please
 Chidvilaasam
 Haasyaanadam

Travelogues 

 Travelogue America
 Travelogue Europe (1989)
 Travelogue America (1990)
 Travelogue Singapore
 Himalayam-Mahimaalayam (Travelogue of Char Dham Spiritual Yaatra) (2004)
 Americalo marosaari (2008)
 Narmada Parikrama (Spiritual tour around Narmada river) (2009)
 Travelogue Dubai, Turkey and Greece (2011)
 Travelogue Eastern Europe (2011)
 Travelogue China (2013)
 Travelogue Japan (2015)
 Travelogue Jordan & Egypt (2015)
 Travelogue Mexico (2013)
 Travelogue Spain & Portugal (2014)

Short story collections 

 Kathakali – each story less than 500 words
 Kathakeli – each story less than 500 words
 Sagatu Manushulu
 Mrutyvaagadu
 Premiste Emavutundi
 Akshara Silpulu
 Nerasthulu
 Malladi Kathalu
 Neeti Leni Manushulu

Translated short story collections 

 American Crime Stories
 Videsi Kathalu
 Mystery Stories
 Murder Stories
 Mini Crime Kathalu
 Manmadha Baanaalu
 Chaavuki Chirunaama

Literary autobiographies 
 Jarigina Katha
 Navala Venuka Katha

Sources 

Telugu writers
1949 births
Living people
Andhra University alumni
Writers from Vijayawada